Eckerö is a municipality of Åland, an autonomous territory under Finnish sovereignty. The municipality has a population of 
which 
is water. The population density is
.

It is the westernmost municipality of Åland and Finland.
The company Eckerö Linjen operates a ferry connection between Berghamn in Storby, Eckerö and Grisslehamn on Väddö, Norrtälje in Sweden.

The municipality has previously also been known as Ekkerö in Finnish documents, but is today referred to as "Eckerö" also in Finnish.

Eckerö's most famous building is the Post and Customs house. It is the largest building that has been erected to aid the postal services between Stockholm and St. Petersburg. The building was built during the Russian era in 1828. Architect C.L Engel made the construction plans.

References

External links

Eckerö Municipality's official website

Eckerö Post and Customs house

Municipalities of Åland